Homoranthus virgatus commonly known as twiggy homoranthus, is a species of flowering plant in the family Myrtaceae and is found growing in coastal areas of northern New South Wales and in Queensland. It is an upright shrub with wand-like branches, aromatic foliage and white to pink flowers in small clusters at the end of branches.

Description
The calyx tube is five-ribbed with wide, concave bracteoles, and the style extends about  beyond the floral tube. Flowering occurs from August to September.

Taxonomy and naming
Homoranthus virgatus was first formally described in 1843 by Johannes Conrad Schauer from an unpublished description by Allan Cunningham and the description was published in Monographia Myrtacearum Xerocarpicarum. The specific epithet (virgatus) is a Latin word meaning "of twigs" or "rodlike".

Distribution and habitat 
Twiggy homoranthus grows in semi-shaded or open situations from Byfield and south to Laurieton within 20 km of the coastline.  Also on several islands close to the mainland of eastern Australia, e.g. Fraser, Bribie, Morton and Stradbroke Islands.

Conservation status
Widespread, often locally common and well reserved.

References

External links
 The Australasian Virtual Herbarium – Occurrence data for Homoranthus virgatus

Flora of Queensland
Flora of New South Wales
Myrtales of Australia
virgatus
Plants described in 1843